Strousberg is a surname. Notable people with the surname include:
 Bethel Henry Strousberg (1823–1884), German industrialist
 Palais Strousberg, palace built in Berlin by Bethel Henry Strousberg

See also 
 Strausberg

Jewish surnames
Germanic-language surnames